No. 196 Squadron was a Royal Air Force squadron originally formed as a training unit during World War I. It was active during World War II in Nos. 3, 4 and 38 Group RAF. It served first as a bomber squadron and later as an airborne support and transport unit.

History

Formation and early years
The first 196 Squadron was originally formed as a training unit at Heliopolis, in Egypt on 9 August 1917 and disbanded a mere 3 months later on 13 November 1917, becoming a part of the Aerial Fighting School.

Reformation and World War II
196 Squadron was reformed at RAF Driffield, Yorkshire on 7 November 1942 as a night bomber unit in No. 4 Group, part of Bomber Command. It was initially equipped with Mk.III and Mk.X Vickers Wellingtons. The squadron carried out many raids on enemy ports and industrial centres in Europe in 1943; it also flew numerous 'gardening' (minelaying) sorties.

On 19 July 1943, the squadron moved south to RAF Witchford, Cambridgeshire, as part of No. 3 Group and was re-equipped with Mk. III Stirling bombers. They moved again to RAF Leicester East later that year and became part of No.38 Group. They then carried out various transport, glider-towing and supply-dropping flights and also undertook SOE and SAS parachuting missions over occupied territories. This required converting to the Mark IV, the 'cloak and dagger' version of the Stirling. On 7 January 1944, the squadron moved again to RAF Tarrant Rushton, Dorset. In February of that year supply drops to the French Resistance commenced, unfortunately with the loss of two aircraft. Many other such missions were subsequently flown successfully.

On 14 March 1944, the squadron was moved yet again in preparation for D-Day to RAF Keevil, Wiltshire. There they trained with 299 Squadron for their part in Operation Overlord. Their mission was to deliver paratroops of the 5th Parachute Brigade and 6th Airborne Division as part of Operation Tonga (each Stirling could carry 20 troops and their equipment). They then had to return to Normandy, towing gliders laden with the main force and their equipment as part of Operation Mallard. At 23:00 on 5 June 1944, 23 Stirlings of 196 Squadron (plus 23 of 299 Squadron), took off to successfully drop paratroops in Normandy, although one aircraft of 196 Squadron was lost. The following day, D-Day itself, a second wave (17 from 196 Squadron), took off at 18:00 towing Horsa gliders as part of Operation Mallard. All returned safely. On 8 June, seven Stirlings carried out a re-supply mission to Normandy as part of Operation Rob Roy.

Between 13 and 17 September 1944, the squadron was heavily involved in Operation Market Garden. 196 Squadron flew 115 sorties, towing gliders and delivering men and supplies under difficult conditions. In total 25 men were killed and 13 aircraft were lost due to anti-aircraft fire and enemy planes during the operation. On 9 October 1944 the squadron was again relocated, this time to RAF Wethersfield, Essex and from there on 26 January 1945 to RAF Shepherds Grove, Suffolk. On 24 March 1945, the squadron took part in Operation Varsity, the Rhine crossing. 30 gliders were towed to Hamminkeln, Germany (89 troops and their equipment) of which one was lost when it crashed in the Netherlands.

In May 1945 troops were taken to Denmark (Operation Schnapps) and Norway (Operation Doomsday) to disarm the German forces there, one aircraft was lost. After the end of the war the squadron was employed on transport support as part of Transport Command, undertaking various troop-ferrying, freight carrying and mail delivery duties before being disbanded on 16 March 1946.

Aircraft operated

Squadron bases

Commanding officers

The Windsor Boys' School
The Windsor Boys' School's Burgess house uses 196 Squadron's badge and motto. The House leaders award is the most honourable award given by the house leader. Only a small number of boys get this award.

See also
 No. 38 Group RAF
 List of Royal Air Force aircraft squadrons

References

Notes

Bibliography

External links

 196 Squadron
 196 Squadron History on MOD site
 196 Squadron Bomber Command History

Military units and formations established in 1942
Aircraft squadrons of the Royal Air Force in World War II
Military units and formations disestablished in 1946
196 Squadron